Escobar is a Spanish surname.

Escobar may also refer to:

Places
Escobar District, Paraguay
Escobar, Paraguay, a town in Escobar District, Paraguay
Escobar Partido, Buenos Aires province, Argentina

Other uses
Escobar (2009 film), based on the life of Pablo Escobar
Escobar Inc, a Colombian multinational conglomerate holding company

See also
San Escobar
Eskobar, a Swedish indie/pop band
Escobares, Texas, U.S.
Escoba, a card game